Ali: A Life is a biography written by American biographer Jonathan Eig. It was first published in 2018 by Simon & Schuster. The biography is about Muhammad Ali.

Plot summary 
Ali: A Life is a 600 dense page chronicling the life of Cassius Clay better known as Muhammad Ali. Jonathan Eig wrote the book after conducting an interview with 500 people who knew Ali.

Reception 
In 2019 Men's Health named Ali: A Life the 23rd best sports book of all time.
In 2020, Esquire called Ali one of the 35 best sports books ever written. In a review, Joyce Carol Oates of The New York Times noted that "...As Muhammad Ali's life was an epic of a life so Ali: A Life is an epic of a biography." It was a finalist for the 2017 NAACP Image Awards, William Hill Sports Book of the Year. It was a finalist for the 2018 Plutarch Award. It won the 2018 PEN/ESPN Award for Literary Sports Writing It also won the 2018 The Times Biography of the Year.
It won the overall Sports Book of the Year, for the 2018 British Sports Book Awards.

References 

2017 non-fiction books
Simon & Schuster books
Books about Muhammad Ali